Arizona Terror  is a 1931 American Pre-Code Western film directed by Phil Rosen and starring Ken Maynard, Lina Basquette and Hooper Atchley.

Partial cast
 Ken Maynard as The Arizonian  
 Lina Basquette as Kay Moore 
 Hooper Atchley as Captain Cole Porter  
 Nina Quartero as Lola  
 Michael Visaroff as Emilio Vasquez  
 Murdock MacQuarrie as Joe Moore  
 Charles King as Henchman Ike  
 Tom London as Henchman Chuckawalla

Plot
Businessman Cole Porter buys cattle from ranchers only to kill them later and recover the money that he paid them. His scheme begins to unravel when one rancher (The Arizonian) survives being wounded. Kay Moore finds The Arizonian and cares for him at her home until her father becomes the next victim. Moore suspects The Arizonian of being the culprit. He flees and joins Mexican outlaw Emilio Vasquez to capture Porter and reveal him as the true criminal.

Production
In addition to Rosen as director, Phil Goldstone was the producer, and Jack Natteford was the writer. Arthur Reed was the photographer, Ralph M. DeLacy was the art director, and Martin G. Cohn was the film editor. Vasquez Rocks in California served as the location setting.

Reception
Harrison's Reports described the film as "A fair Western" with "good horseback riding, plentiful fights, and fast action."

Preservation
This film is preserved in the Library of Congress collection.

References

External links
 
 

1931 films
1931 Western (genre) films
American Western (genre) films
Films directed by Phil Rosen
American black-and-white films
Tiffany Pictures films
1930s English-language films
1930s American films